Celtic folklore may refer to:

The Folklore in the modern Celtic nations:
 Hebridean mythology and folklore
 Irish folklore
 Scottish folklore
 Welsh folklore

Or the mythologies of ancient and modern Celtic peoples:
 Celtic mythology
 Irish mythology
 Welsh mythology

See also 
Gaelic folklore (disambiguation)